This is a list of cities and towns in Turkey by population, which includes cities and towns that are provincial capitals or have a population of at least 7,000. The total population of Turkey is  85,279,553 according to the 2023 estimate, making it the 18th most populated country in the world.

Istanbul, Turkey's economic and cultural capital is the largest city with a population of 15.84 million in its metropolitan area as of 2021.
Ankara, the capital of Turkey and Turkey's second largest city has a population of 5.7 million in its metropolitan area as of 2021.
Izmir, Turkey's third largest city has a population of over 4.3 million in its metropolitan area as of 2019.
Bursa, Turkey's fourth largest city has a population of over 3.1 million in its metropolitan area as of 2021.
Antalya, Turkey's fifth-largest city has a population of 2.6 million in its metropolitan area as of 2019.

Cities and towns with more than 7,000 inhabitants 
Cities and Towns with a population of over 7,000 inhabitants according to the Turkish Statistical Institute are listed in the following table, along with the results of the censuses from 21 October 1990 and 22 October 2000, as well as the provinces in which the cities are located. The numbers of inhabitants refer to the actual city, not including urban areas.

Provinces of Turkey

Map

See also 
List of regions in Turkey
List of provinces in Turkey
List of districts in Turkey   
List of villages in Turkey
Metropolitan centers in Turkey

References

External links 
State Institute of Statistics

 
Turkey
Turkey
Largest